One Mic Stand is an Indian standup comedy television show series created by Only Much Louder for Amazon Video. It is not like a typical standup comedy show in that it hosts India's famous actors, politicians, influencers, writers and musicians who are trained by Comedians to perform standup comedy for first time. This series has 2 seasons on Amazon Prime Video and both seasons are hosted by comedian Sapan Verma.

Seasons 
On 15 November 2019, One Mic Stand released their 1st season with 5 episodes. Bhuvan Bam, Taapsee Pannu, Richa Chadda, Vishal Dadlani and Shashi Tharur performed their first time ever standup comedy. Zakir Khan, Kunal Kamra, Ashish Shakya, Rohan Joshi and Angad Singh Ranyal were the mentors, trainers and the guest comedians in this season.

After 2 years, they released season 2 on 22 October 2021 with 5 episodes. The celebrities who performed their first standup are Sunny Leone, Karan Johar, Chetan Bhagat, Faye D'Souza and Raftaar. The guest comedy and trainings were performed by Samay Raina, Neeti Palta, Sumukhi Suresh, Atul Khatri and Abish Mathew.

Season 1

Season 2

References

Further reading
 

2019 Indian television series debuts
Amazon Prime Video original programming
Indian stand-up comedy television series
Indian reality television series
Indian comedy